The Department of Supply and Development was an Australian government department that existed between April 1948 and March 1950.

Scope
Information about the department's functions and/or government funding allocation could be found in the Administrative Arrangements Orders, the annual Portfolio Budget Statements and in the department's annual reports.

The department was set up by the Chifley Government to control services that were deemed essential to supporting Australia's armed forces. Its creation saw the rearrangement of the Department of Munitions and the Department of Supply and Shipping. The functions of the department included:
research, design and development in relation to war material 
the provision or supply of war materiel
the manufacture or assembly of aircraft or parts thereof
arrangements for the establishment or extension of industries for purposes of defence
the acquisition, maintenance and disposal of stocks of goods in connection with defence; and
the arrangement or co-ordination of:
surveys, of Australian industrial capacity and the preparation  of plans to ensure the effective operation of industry in time  of war, including plans for the decentralization of secondary industries and particularly those relating to defence; and
the investigation and development of Australian sources of supply of goods necessary for the economic security of the Commonwealth in time of war, and, in particular, the investigation and development of additional oil and strategic mineral resources, the production of power alcohol from sugar or other vegetable crops, and the production of oil from coal or shale.

Structure
The department was a Commonwealth Public Service department, staffed by officials who were responsible to the Minister for Supply and Development, initially John Armstrong (until Labor's defeat at the 1949 election) and subsequently Richard Casey.

Abolition
The department was abolished by the Menzies Government in 1950 in a reorganisation planned by Richard Casey.

References

Supply and Development
Ministries established in 1948